Aphanostephus riddellii is a North American species of flowering plants in the family Asteraceae, with the common name Riddell's lazydaisy. It is native to the southwestern and south-central United States (states of New Mexico and Texas), as well as to the state of Coahuila in northern Mexico.

Aphanostephus riddellii is perennial herb up to 50 cm (20 inches) tall. It grows in open, sunny locations, often amongst scrub oaks.
The plant is named for American botanist John Leonard Riddell, 1807 – 1865.

References

External links
Lady Bird Johnson Wildflower Center, University of Texas

Astereae
Flora of the South-Central United States
Plants described in 1842
Flora of Northeastern Mexico
Flora without expected TNC conservation status